Jeremy Evan Tepper (born 1963) is an American musician, journalist, and record industry executive. The former frontman of the band World Famous Blue Jays, he founded the record label Diesel Only Records in 1990, along with Jay Sherman-Godfrey and Albert Caiati. Along with Caiati, Tepper subsequently became the "head honcho" of Diesel Only. He was also the managing editor of the magazine Vending Times prior to 1992, and later became the publisher and editor-in-chief of the jukebox industry trade journal Street Beat. Prior to becoming format manager for Sirius Satellite Radio's Outlaw Country channel in 2004, he had also worked for CDuctive and eMusic.com, and had served as the editor of the Journal of Country Music and as a country music critic for Pulse!.

Personal life
Tepper graduated from New York University. His father, Noel Tepper, was a lawyer in Poughkeepsie, New York, and his mother, Elly Tepper, was a third-grade teacher at Keolu Elementary School in Kailua, Honolulu County, Hawaii. In 1997, he married Laura Cantrell.

References

1963 births
Living people
New York University alumni
Country musicians from New York (state)
American magazine editors
American music industry executives
American music critics